Great Harwood railway station was located in the south east side of Great Harwood, Lancashire, England on Station Road, which still remains. The station was on a branch line, usually known as the Great Harwood loop, of the East Lancashire Line from Burnley to Blackburn via Rose Grove, Padiham, Simonstone and Great Harwood.

History
The line between Padiham and Rose Grove opened in 1875. West of Padiham, it opened two years later, as a result of difficulties in constructing the embankments between Great Harwood and Simonstone in the vicinity of Martholme Viaduct.

It was closed to regular passenger trains on 2 December 1957 but special trains operated until complete closure in 1964. Subsequently the station was later demolished and the site converted to an industrial estate. The line through the town and further west has been converted to a cycle way and footpath linking with the Leeds and Liverpool Canal west of the town.

References

Disused railway stations in Hyndburn
Former Lancashire and Yorkshire Railway stations
Great Harwood
Railway stations in Great Britain opened in 1877
Railway stations in Great Britain closed in 1957